Cincinnati West Airport , formerly Harrison Airport, is a general aviation airport in Harrison, Ohio, United States. It can be accessed from Interstate 74. The airport is owned by Cincinnati State Technical and Community College. Its fixed-base operator is Whitewater Aviation.

History
Cincinnati West Airport began in 1939 when Orville and Alvin Jackson plowed an airstrip through a hayfield owned by Woiden Radcliffe. It officially opened in 1947 as Harrison Airport. Runway lights were installed in 1954.

A 1969 proposal called for the privately owned Harrison Airport to be expanded for use as Cincinnati's executive airport, after plans to expand Blue Ash Airport into a reliever for Greater Cincinnati Airport were blocked by local opposition. However, Harrison Airport's proximity to William Henry Harrison High School and Harrison Junior High School complicated any expansion plans. Instead, the runway was reconfigured to avoid the schools.

Morton Rabkin purchased Harrison Airport in 1981. In 1986, he renamed the airport to Cincinnati West Airport and sold it to Bob McKenna.

In 1995, the city of Harrison annexed Cincinnati West Airport. That August, Cincinnati State Technical and Community College purchased the airport from McKenna Air Inc. to support its federally approved, two-year aviation maintenance technologies program. It spent $4.14 million in state funds to purchase and renovate the facilities. In 1998, the school opened a Cincinnati State West satellite campus next door.

Facilities and aircraft
The airport operates an Automated Weather Observation System.

For the 12-month period ending August 1, 2014, the airport had 30,197 aircraft operations, an average of about 581 per week: 86% general aviation, 14% air taxi, and fewer than 1% military. In that time, there were 36 aircraft based at this airport: 32 single-engine and four multi-engine. The airport is attended daily, year-round.

Accidents
On August 8, 1981, a fire destroyed a hangar and four planes and seriously damaged two others. On October 10, 2004, a Cessna 172 and a Cessna 152 practicing landings at the airport collided midair and landed in a gravel pit across the street, injuring two.

References

External links
 
 Whitewater Aviation, the airport's fixed-base operator
 

 Cincinnati West Airport economic impact by the Ohio Department of Transportation

Airports in Ohio
Transportation buildings and structures in Hamilton County, Ohio
1947 establishments in Ohio
Harrison, Ohio